The  is Japanese aerial lift line in the city of Shizuoka in Shizuoka Prefecture, operated by Shizuoka Railway (Shizutetsu). Opened in 1967, the line climbs , a hill with views of the city, Suruga Bay, and Mount Fuji. The line does not accept LuLuCa, a smart card ticketing system by Shizutetsu.

Basic data
System: Aerial tramway, 3 cables
Distance: 
Vertical interval: 
Passenger capacity per a cabin: 55
Cabins: 2
Operational speed: 3.6 m/s
Stations: 2
Time required for single ride: 5 minutes

See also
Shizuoka Railway Shizuoka–Shimizu Line
List of aerial lifts in Japan

External links
 Official website

Aerial tramways in Japan
Buildings and structures in Shizuoka Prefecture
1967 establishments in Japan